Throwback Throwdown II was the second annual Throwback Throwdown professional wrestling event produced by Impact Wrestling that aired on Impact Plus and YouTube. It took place on December 18, 2021 at Davis Arena in Louisville, Kentucky, the home base of Impact's developmental territory Ohio Valley Wrestling (OVW), whose talent was also featured on the card.

This was the final in-ring appearance for Impact for Rohit Raju, who left the company at the end of the year.

Production

Background 
The first Throwback Throwdown was a special episode of Impact that aired on November 26, 2019 and saw wrestlers portraying 1980's characters and gimmicks in the fictional Impact Provincial Wrestling Federation (IPWF). On November 20, 2021, at Turning Point, Impact announced that Throwback Throwdown II would be held at Davis Arena in Louisville, Kentucky on December 18, 2021 as an Impact Plus Monthly Special.

Storylines  
The event featured several professional wrestling matches, and wrestlers portray heroes, villains, or less distinguishable characters. Due to the nature of the event, the storylines for Throwback Throwdown II were self-contained and independent from the rest of Impact's programming.

Results

References

External links 
 

2021 Impact Plus Monthly Special events
2021 in professional wrestling
Events in Louisville, Kentucky
December 2021 events in the United States
Professional wrestling in Kentucky